Craig Mills (born August 27, 1976) is a Canadian former ice hockey winger who played for the Winnipeg Jets and Chicago Blackhawks of the National Hockey League between 1996 and 1999. He is the son of Ontario politician Dennis Mills, and was born in Toronto, Ontario.

Playing career
As a youth, Mills played in the 1990 Quebec International Pee-Wee Hockey Tournament with a minor ice hockey team from North York.

Mills was the recipient of the OHL Humanitarian of the Year and the CHL Humanitarian of the Year Award in 1996. He was also part of Canada's gold medal winning hockey team in the 1996 World Junior Ice Hockey Championships. He captained the Belleville Bulls of the OHL from 1994-96. 

Mills was drafted 108th overall by the Jets in the 1994 NHL Entry Draft.  He played 31 career NHL games, with zero goals and five assists. On August 16, 1996, Mills was traded by the Phoenix Coyotes with Alexei Zhamnov and a first-round draft choice (Ty Jones) to the Chicago Blackhawks in exchange for Jeremy Roenick.  On June 12, 2001, Mills was traded by the Phoenix Coyotes again with Robert Reichel and Travis Green to the Toronto Maple Leafs in exchange for Daniil Markov.

Career statistics

Regular season and playoffs

International

References

External links
 

1976 births
Living people
Belleville Bulls players
Brûleurs de Loups players
Canadian expatriate ice hockey players in Russia
Canadian ice hockey forwards
Chicago Blackhawks players
Chicago Wolves (IHL) players
Indianapolis Ice players
Lokomotiv Yaroslavl players
Nybro Vikings players
Portland Pirates players
St. John's Maple Leafs players
Ice hockey people from Toronto
Springfield Falcons players
Winnipeg Jets (1979–1996) draft picks
Winnipeg Jets (1979–1996) players